Arkimedes Arguelyes Rodrigues (born 9 July 1988 in Leningrad) is a Russian former professional road racing cyclist, who competed between 2010 and 2014 for the , ,  and  teams.

Major results

2009
2nd Overall Volta a Tarragona
2010
4th Overall Troféu Cidade da Guarda
1st Stage 1
6th Overall Istrian Spring Trophy
10th Overall Tour de Bretagne
2013
8th Trofeo Matteotti
2014
5th GP Industrie del Marmo
6th Klasika Primavera

References

External links

Living people
Russian male cyclists
1988 births
Cyclists from Saint Petersburg